David Stephens (birth unknown) is a former rugby union and professional rugby league footballer who played in the 1960s and 1970s.

Background
David Stephens was a teacher at Airedale Secondary Modern school, Castleford .

Playing career

Club career
David Stephens changed rugby football codes from rugby union to rugby league, when he was transferred from Wakefield RFC to Wigan following a dispute regarding his position, he preferred to play at centre, whereas Wakefield RFC preferred him to play on the wing, he made his début for Wigan in the 23-10 victory over Whitehaven at Recreation Ground, Whitehaven on Wednesday 18 August 1965, he scored his first try for Wigan in the 12-17 defeat by New Zealand at Central Park, Wigan on Saturday 4 September 1965, he scored his last try (2-tries) for Wigan in the 11-4 victory over Batley at Central Park, Wigan on Wednesday 13 December 1967, and he played his last match for Wigan in the 2-9 defeat by Rochdale Hornets at Athletic Grounds, Rochdale on Friday 22 December 1967.

County Cup Finals
David Stephens played , i.e. number 5, in Castleford's 11-22 defeat by Leeds in the 1968 Yorkshire County Cup Final during the 1968–69 season at Belle Vue, Wakefield on Saturday 19 October 1968.

References

External links
Search for "Stephens" at rugbyleagueproject.org
David Stephens Memory Box Search at archive.castigersheritage.com

Living people
Castleford Tigers players
English rugby league players
English rugby union players
Place of birth missing (living people)
Rugby league centres
Rugby league wingers
Wakefield RFC players
Wigan Warriors players
Year of birth missing (living people)